The MV  Veteran is a ferry operating in the province of Newfoundland and Labrador, Canada. She is operated by the provincial Department of Transportation and Infrastructure, entering service on the route from Newfoundland to Fogo Island and Change Islands at the end of 2015.

Veteran is the first of two vessels built for the province by Damen Group in Galați, Romania. The second, MV Legionnaire, currently serves the Portugal Cove-St. Philip's to Bell Island (Newfoundland and Labrador) route, alongside the MV Flanders. The vessels’ names commemorate the centennial of the Royal Newfoundland Regiment’s landing at Gallipoli, in the Ottoman Empire in 1915.

External links
 Fogo Island - Change Islands - Farewell ferry schedules
 MV Veteran promotional video
 Video showing the launch of the MV Veteran
 Damen Group product page

References

Ferries of Newfoundland and Labrador
2015 ships
Ships built in Romania